WBBA-FM is a Classic Rock formatted broadcast radio station serving the Pittsfield and Pike County, Illinois.  WBBA-FM is owned and operated by DJ Two Rivers Radio. DJ Two Rivers Radio purchased WBBA-FM in 2003, along with sister station WJBM, from Brown Radio Group Inc. for $320,000 in 2003. WBBA-FM aired a country music format at the time of its sale, and was branded "Double barreled country".

WBBA airs games and programming of the St. Louis Cardinals professional baseball team.

On October 4, 2021 WBBA dropped the News/Radio format and switched to Classic Rock format branded Classic Rock 97.5. This format change also allowed a deal with the Kansas City Chiefs professional football team to be broadcast on WBBA-FM.

References

External links
 WBBA Radio Online
 

BBA-FM